Thomas, Tommy, or Tom Hamilton may refer to:

Scottish peers
Thomas Hamilton, 1st Earl of Haddington (1563–1637), Scottish administrator, Lord Advocate and judge
Thomas Hamilton, 2nd Earl of Haddington (1600–1640), Scottish nobleman
Thomas Hamilton, 3rd Earl of Haddington (1626–1645), Scottish nobleman
Thomas Hamilton, 6th Earl of Haddington (1680–1735), Scottish politician and nobleman
Thomas Hamilton, 7th Earl of Haddington (1721–1794), Scottish nobleman
Thomas Hamilton, 9th Earl of Haddington (1780–1858), British Conservative politician and statesman

Literature and academia
Thomas Hamilton (writer) (1789–1842), Scottish philosopher and author
Thomas Hamilton (university administrator) (1842–1926), Northern Ireland clergyman and academician
Thomas H. Hamilton (1914–1979), American academic administrator
Thomas Wm. Hamilton (1939-), astronomer namesake of asteroid 4897 Tomhamilton and author of science fiction

Sports
Thomas Ferrier Hamilton (1820–1905), Australian cricketer, also a pastoralist and politician
Thomas Hamilton (cricketer, born 1992), English cricketer
Thomas Hamilton (footballer, born 1872) (1872–1942), Scottish international footballer
Thomas Hamilton (footballer, born 1906) (1906–1964), Scottish international footballer
Thomas Hamilton (basketball) (born 1975), American basketball player
Tom Hamilton (American football) (1905–1994), American football player, coach, college athletics administrator and naval aviator
Tom Hamilton (baseball) (1925–1973), Major League Baseball player
Tom Hamilton (footballer, born 1893) (1893–1959), Scottish footballer
Tom Hamilton (sportscaster) (born 1956), radio announcer for the Cleveland Guardians Major League Baseball team
Tommy Hamilton (born 1935), Irish former footballer

Music
Tom Hamilton (musician) (born 1951), American bassist with Aerosmith
Tom Hamilton Jr. (born 1978), American songwriter, musician and producer
Tom Hamilton (electronic musician), American pop/electro/rock musician

Others
Thomas Hamilton (architect) (1784–1858), Scottish architect, or his father, Thomas Hamilton (1754–1824), also an architect
Thomas de Courcy Hamilton (1825–1908), Scottish recipient of the Victoria Cross
Thomas Kinley Hamilton (1853–1917), Irish doctor and land speculator in Australia
Thomas Glendenning Hamilton (1873–1935), Canadian doctor, school board trustee and member of the Manitoba legislature
Thomas F. Hamilton (1894–1969), aviator and founder of the Hamilton Standard Company
Thomas Watt Hamilton (1952–1996), perpetrator of the Dunblane massacre
Tom Hamilton (aircraft designer), founder of Stoddard-Hamilton Aircraft
Tom Hamilton (politician) (born 1954), Unionist politician in Northern Ireland
Thomas Hamilton, Lord Priestfield (died 1611), Scottish judge
Thomas W. Hamilton (Medal of Honor) (1833–1869), United States Navy Medal of Honor recipient
Thomas Hamilton (South Carolina legislator), Reconstruction era state legislator and rice farmer

See also
Hamilton (name)